The arghul, also spelled argul, arghoul, arghool, argol, or yarghul, is a musical instrument in the reed family. It has been used since ancient Egyptian times and is still used as a traditional instrument in Egypt, Syria, Jordan, and Palestine.

Basic characteristics
Modern Egyptians.)
Modern Arghul, 3 ft. 2½ in. long.

The arghul is a double-pipe, Single-reed  woodwind instrument that consists of two tubes: a melody pipe with between five and seven holes and a longer drone (Arabic ardiyya, "ground") pipe.  Its tone is similar to that of a clarinet, although a bit more reed-like.  Unlike the similar mijwiz, the arghul has fingering holes on only one of the instrument's pipes (the melody pipe), and the drone pipe has a detachable length that allows the player to alter the pitch of the drone.

In the illustration above
all three lengths are shown in use. An arghul belonging to the
collection of the Conservatoire Royal at Brussels, described by
Victor Mahillon in his catalogue (No. 113), gives the following
scale: —

Arghuls are used in Egypt and other Arab nations as an accompaniment to belly dancing, Dabke, and other types of Arabic musical performances. Circular breathing is an important part of the playing of the instrument.

There are three varieties of arghuls: the small arghul (arghoul alasghar), the medium arghul (arghoul alsoghayr), and the large arghul (arghoul alkebir).

Çifte
Çifte is a Turkish folk instrument of the wind type. It is made by tying two reed pipes side by side. Two small reed pieces which produce the sound are added to the ends of both reeds. These two small reeds are taken into the mouth cavity and it is played by blowing the air into both at the same time.

There are two çifte types known as Demli Çifte and Demsiz Çifte. In demli çifte one of the reeds does not have any pitch keys and it just produces a drone. There are melody keys on the other reed and the main melody is played through them.

Çifte is also known as Argun, Argul, Kargın or Zambır at different regions.

In Turkish, the word "çifte" also refers to a double-barreled shotgun, no doubt because of the barrels' resemblance to the wind instrument.

Dozaleh
See main article: Dozaleh
The dozaleh  is one of the old folk wind instruments of Iran which is used in mirth celebrations.
Abu Nasr Farabi had called it Mezmarol-Mosana or Mozdavadg [mozdavej] ("married"). The dozaleh has a sound like Ney-anbān [neianbAn] (bagpipe), but to some extent more clear and lower. It is played in Khorasan [xorAsAn], Kermanshah [KermAnSAh], and mostly in Iran. In some different dialects it is called Zanbooreh [zanbureh].

See also
Aulos
Launeddas
Mijwiz

Notes

References
Attribution:

External links
Arghul page from Zaman Production site
The making of the Arghul, in Egypt by Dominik Huber

Listening
Arghul audio

Single-reed instruments
North African musical instruments
Arabic musical instruments
Turkish musical instruments
Syrian musical instruments
Ancient Egyptian musical instruments